Guddi Maruti is an Indian actress best known for her comedy roles on TV and in Bollywood movies.

Early life 
Maruti was born to an actor-director father Marutirao Parab. Her real name is Tahira Parab and she was nicknamed Guddi. Manmohan Desai gave her the screen name which is what she is known by today.

Career 
Maruti started her career at the age of 10 years as a child artist in the film Jaan Haazir Hain. After her father's death, she continued acting to support the family. Due to her physical appearance, she bagged comedy roles in films and kept on going with her career.

Maruti has acted in over 97 movies since the 1980s. Over the years, she acted in TV shows and is well known for her role as Bua in the TV show Doli Armano Ki. Her popular movies include Khiladi, Shola Aur Shabnam, Aashik Aawara, Dulhe Raja and Biwi No. 1. She did not take chances to get to mainstream acting to avoid risks of being unsuccessful.

In 1995, Maruti and Vrajesh Hirjee did a stand up comedy show, Sorry Meri Lorry, which also added to her fame.

She took a career break in 2006 and rejoined the film industry in 2015. She started her career again with the comedy movie Hum Sab Ullu Hain.

Personal life
Married to Ashok

Filmography

Television 
 Idhar Udhar (1986) as Moti Shabnam
 Shreeman Shreemati  (1995) as Mrs. Mehta
 Agadam Bagdam Tigdam (2007) as Rosie
 Mrs. Kaushik Ki Paanch Bahuein  (2012) as Paddy Aunty
 Doli Armaano Ki (2013) as Bua
 Yeh Un Dinon Ki Baat Hai (2018–2019) as Principal Ma'am VJN College
 Hello Zindagi (2019) as Bijoya Di

References

External links
 

Year of birth missing (living people)
Actresses in Hindi cinema
Indian film actresses
Living people
Place of birth missing (living people)